Sauerkraut ("sour cabbage") is finely cut raw cabbage that has been fermented by various lactic acid bacteria. It has a long shelf life and a distinctive sour flavor, both of which result from the lactic acid formed when the bacteria ferment the sugars in the cabbage leaves. It is one of the best-known national dishes in Germany.

Although in English-speaking countries it is known under its German name, it is also widely known in Eastern Europe and other places (see below). For example, in Ukraine,  'sour cabbage' or  'fermented cabbage' has been a traditional and ubiquitous dish from ancient times.

Overview and history

Fermented foods have a long history in many cultures, with sauerkraut being one of the most well-known instances of traditional fermented moist cabbage side dishes. The Roman writers Cato (in his De Agri Cultura) and Columella (in his De re Rustica) mentioned preserving cabbages and turnips with salt. It is believed to have been introduced to Europe in its present form 1,000 years ago by Genghis Khan after he invaded  China.

Although "sauerkraut" is from a German word (Sauerkraut), the dish did not originate in Germany.  Some claim fermenting cabbage suan cai was already practised in the days of the building of the Great Wall of China and that the practice was likely transmitted from China to Europe by the Tartars. However, the Romans, as previously noted, pickled forms of cabbage, and were the more likely source of modern-day sauerkraut  It then took root in Central and Eastern European cuisines, but also in other countries including the Netherlands, where it is known as zuurkool, and France, where the name became choucroute. The English name is borrowed from German where it means "sour cabbage". The names in Slavic and other Central and Eastern European languages have similar meanings with the German word: "fermented cabbage" (Turkısh: lahana turşusu, 
, Persian: kalam torş) or "sour cabbage" (kysla kapusta).

Before frozen foods, refrigeration, and cheap transport from warmer areas became readily available in Northern, Central, and Eastern Europe, sauerkraut – like other preserved foods – provided a source of nutrients during the winter. Captain James Cook always took a store of sauerkraut on his sea voyages, since experience had taught him it prevented scurvy.

The word "Kraut", derived from this food, is a derogatory term for the German people. During World War I, due to concerns the American public would reject a product with a German name, American sauerkraut makers relabeled their product as "liberty cabbage" for the duration of the war.

Production

Sauerkraut is made by a process of pickling called lactic acid fermentation that is analogous to how traditional (not heat-treated) pickled cucumbers and kimchi are made. The cabbage is finely shredded, layered with salt, and left to ferment. Fully cured sauerkraut keeps for several months in an airtight container stored at 15 °C (60 °F) or below. Neither refrigeration nor pasteurization is required, although these treatments prolong storage life.

Fermentation by lactobacilli is introduced naturally, as these air-borne bacteria culture on raw cabbage leaves where they grow. Yeasts also are present, and may yield soft sauerkraut of poor flavor when the fermentation temperature is too high. The fermentation process has three phases, collectively sometimes referred to as population dynamics. In the first phase, anaerobic bacteria such as Klebsiella and Enterobacter lead the fermentation, and begin producing an acidic environment that favors later bacteria. The second phase starts as the acid levels become too high for many bacteria, and Leuconostoc mesenteroides and other Leuconostoc species take dominance. In the third phase, various Lactobacillus species, including L. brevis and L. plantarum, ferment any remaining sugars, further lowering the pH. Properly cured sauerkraut is sufficiently acidic to prevent a favorable environment for the growth of Clostridium botulinum, the toxins of which cause botulism.

A 2004 genomic study found an unexpectedly large diversity of lactic acid bacteria in sauerkraut, and that previous studies had oversimplified this diversity. Weissella was found to be a major organism in the initial, heterofermentative stage, up to day 7. It was also found that Lactobacillus brevis and Pediococcus pentosaceus had smaller population numbers in the first 14 days than previous studies had reported.

The Dutch sauerkraut industry found that inoculating a new batch of sauerkraut with an old batch resulted in an excessively sour product. This sourdough process is known as "backslopping" or "inoculum enrichment"; when used in making sauerkraut, first- and second-stage population dynamics, important to developing flavor, are bypassed. This is due primarily to the greater initial activity of species L. plantarum.

Regional varieties

In Azerbaijani, Belarusian, Estonian, Latvian, Lithuanian, Moravian, Polish, Russian, and Ukrainian cuisine, chopped cabbage is often pickled together with shredded carrots. Other ingredients may include caraway seeds, whole or quartered apples for additional flavor or cranberry for flavor and better keeping (the benzoic acid in cranberries is a common preservative). Sometimes the finely chopped outer green cabbage leaves are fermented for special "grey" schi. Bell peppers and beets are added in some recipes for color. The resulting sauerkraut salad is typically served cold, as zakuski or a side dish. A homemade type of very mild sauerkraut is available, where white cabbage is pickled with salt in a refrigerator for only three to seven days. This process results in very little lactic acid production. Sometimes in Russia double fermentation is used, with the initial step producing an exceptionally sour product, which is then "corrected" by adding 30-50% more fresh cabbage and fermenting the mix again. The flavor additives like apples, beets, cranberries, and sometimes even watermelons are usually introduced at this step.

Sauerkraut may be used as a filling for Polish pierogi, Ukrainian varenyky, Russian pirogi and pirozhki. Sauerkraut is also the central ingredient in traditional soups, such as shchi (a national dish of Russia), kwaśnica (Poland), kapustnica (Slovakia), and zelňačka (Czech Republic resp. Moravian). It is an ingredient of Polish bigos (a hunter's stew).

In Germany and Austria, cooked sauerkraut is often flavored with juniper berries or caraway seeds; apples and white wine are added in popular variations. In South Tyrol, it is made with Juniper berries, Extra-virgin olive oil and smoked pancetta. Traditionally it is served warm, with pork (e.g. eisbein, schweinshaxe, Kassler) or sausages (smoked or fried sausages, Frankfurter Würstchen, Vienna sausages, black pudding), accompanied typically by roasted or steamed potatoes or dumplings (knödel or schupfnudel). Similar recipes are common in other Central European cuisines. The Czech national dish vepřo knedlo zelo consists of roast pork with knedliky and sauerkraut.

In Bulgaria, Montenegro, Serbia, Bosnia, Croatia, North Macedonia and Slovenia, usually the whole cabbage heads are pickled. Such produce is used for many dishes, from a simple salad made of chopped cabbage and sprinkled with paprika, to cabbage rolls. In northern parts of Serbia and Croatia, it is often added to the bean soup. In central Serbia, a local specialty called "wedding cabbage" is made by slowly stewing roughly cut cabbage with at least three kinds of meats, lean, fatty, and smoked.

In Romania, the local type of sauerkraut ("varza murata" = whole pickled cabbage heads) are used as wrap for the national dish called "Sarmale", a Turkish-inspired roll, made of pickled cabbage leaves with minced pork and rice, having its own personality and very distinct in taste from its Ottoman predecessor.

In France, sauerkraut is the main ingredient of the Alsatian meal choucroute garnie (French for "dressed sauerkraut"), sauerkraut with sausages (Strasbourg sausages, smoked Morteau or Montbéliard sausages), charcuterie (bacon, ham, etc.), and often potatoes.

In Chile it is called chucrut and is a common topping for sandwiches and hotdogs, especially for completos.

Sauerkraut, along with pork, is eaten traditionally in Pennsylvania on New Year's Day. The tradition, started by the Pennsylvania Dutch, is thought to bring good luck for the upcoming year. Sauerkraut is also used in American cuisine as a condiment upon various foods, such as sandwiches and hot dogs. In Maryland, particularly in Baltimore and on the Eastern Shore, sauerkraut is a traditional accompaniment for the Thanksgiving turkey.

As Europeans, especially Germans, emigrated to other countries, many of them continued making and eating sauerkraut around the world.

Health effects

Benefits

Many health benefits have been claimed for sauerkraut:

 It is a high source of vitamins C and K; the fermentation process increases the bioavailability of nutrients rendering sauerkraut even more nutritious than the original cabbage. It is also low in food energy and high in calcium and magnesium, and it is a very good source of dietary fiber, folate, iron, potassium, copper and manganese.
 If unpasteurized and uncooked, sauerkraut also contains live lactobacilli and beneficial microbes and is rich in enzymes. Fiber and probiotics improve digestion and promote the growth of healthy bowel flora, protecting against many diseases of the digestive tract.

 During the American Civil War, the physician John Jay Terrell (1829–1922) was able to successfully reduce the death rate from disease among prisoners of war; he attributed this to feeding his patients raw sauerkraut.
 Sauerkraut and its juice is a time-honored folk remedy for canker sores. The treatment is to rinse the mouth with sauerkraut juice for about 30 seconds several times a day, or place a wad of sauerkraut against the affected area for a minute or so before chewing and swallowing the sauerkraut.
 In 2002, the Journal of Agriculture and Food Chemistry  reported that Finnish researchers found the isothiocyanates produced in sauerkraut fermentation inhibit the growth of cancer cells in test tube and animal studies. A Polish study in 2010 concluded that "induction of the key detoxifying enzymes by cabbage juices, particularly sauerkraut, may be responsible for their chemopreventive activity demonstrated by epidemiological studies and in animal models".

Disadvantages

Excessive consumption of sauerkraut may lead to bloating and flatulence due to the trisaccharide raffinose, which the human small intestine cannot break down. This does not negatively affect long-term health, although it might be uncomfortable. Additionally, sauerkraut has a very high content of sodium.

Similar foods
Many other vegetables are preserved by a similar process:

 Achaar in India, Bangladesh, Nepal, and Pakistan
 Atsara in the Philippines
 Brovada in northern Italy
 Curtido in El Salvador
 Dill pickles in eastern and central Europe
 Encurtido in Nicaragua
 Kimchi in Korea
 Silage, a feed for cattle
 Suan cai in northeastern China
 Tsukemono in Japan
 Kabichima in Jamaica & Caribbean 
 Kiseli kupus in Bosnia, Serbia, Croatia, and Bulgaria

See also

 Baiuvarii
 Coleslaw
 
 
 
 
 Sauerkraut missions

References

Bibliography
 USDA Canning guides, Volume 7

External links

 Laboratory Exercise in Sauerkraut Fermentation
 Fermenting food since before H. sapiens appeared. The American Journal of Clinical Nutrition
 Crunchy pickled cabbage: video-tutorial
 Fermentation Tips for Beginners

Ancient dishes
Cabbage dishes
Condiments
German cuisine
Austrian cuisine
National dishes
Cuisine of Baltimore
Pickles
Plant-based fermented foods
Sour foods
Vegan cuisine